The Shanti Bahini (meaning "Peace Force") was the armed wing of the Parbatya Chattagram Jana Samhati Samiti (United People's Party of the Chittagong Hill Tracts) in Bangladesh. It is considered an insurgent group in Bangladesh. The Shanti Bahini was made out of mostly members from the Chakma tribe.

History 
Following the independence of Bangladesh in 1971, Manabendra Narayan Larma founded the Parbatya Chattagram Jana Samhati Samiti (PCJSS) on 15 February 1972, seeking to build an organization representing all the tribal peoples of the Chittagong Hill Tracts. Larma was elected to the Bangladesh Jatiya Sangsad, the national legislature of Bangladesh as a candidate of the PCJSS in 1973. When Larma's continued efforts to make the government recognize the rights of the tribal peoples through political discussions had failed, Larma and the PCJSS began organizing the Shanti Bahini (Peace Corps), an armed force operating in the Hill Tracts area. It was formed in 1972 and fought for many years against the government.

Shanti Bahini began attacking Bangladesh Army convoys in 1977. They carried out kidnappings and extortion. Larma subsequently went into hiding from government security forces. Factionalism within the PCJS weakened Larma's standing and he was assassinated on 10 November 1983. On 23 June 1981 the Shanti Bahini attacked a camp of Bangladesh rifles, killing 13 people. They later captured and executed 24 members of the Bangladesh rifles. In the 1980s the Government of Bangladesh started to provide land for thousands of landless Bengali . Many Bengali were forced to move to secure regions because of the insurgency, abandoning their land to the tribal communities. On 29 April 1986, Shanti Bahini massacred 19 Bengali. On 26 June 1989 the Shanti Bahini burned down villages where inhabitants had voted in Bangladeshi elections. In 1996 Shanti Bahini abducted and killed 30 Bengalis. On 9 September 1996, the Shanti Bahini massacred a group of Bengali lumberjacks, who were under the impression they'd been called to a meeting. Members of Shanti Bahini extracted some four million dollars from the local population in the name of toll collection.

The Shanti Bahini abandoned militancy when the Bangladesh Awami League negotiated the Chittagong Hill Tracts Peace Accord between the government and the PCJSS on 2 December 1997. Members of Shanti Bahini surrendered their weapons in a stadium in Khagrachari. The treaty saw the lifting of nighttime curfew and the return of 50 thousand refugees. However, some members opposed to the peace deal formed a dissident group. Some of those who opposed the peace treaty formed the United People's Democratic Front as an alternate to the PCJSS. The treaty was also criticised by the Bangladesh Nationalist Party and has not been fully implemented. Some members of Shanti Bahini became police officers after the peace treaty. In August 2014 Indian Border Security Forces arrested members of Shanti Bahini, two Bangladeshi Chakmas and three Indian national Chakmas with weapons in Mizoram.

After the assassination of Sheikh Mujibur Rahman and the removal of Bangladesh Awami League from in 1975, India provided support and shelter to the members of Shanti Bahini. Members of Shanti Bahini were trained in Chakrata, India.

See also 
 Demographics of Bangladesh

References 

Chittagong Hill Tracts conflict
History of Chittagong Division
Military wings of political parties
Separatism in Bangladesh
1972 establishments in Bangladesh